The following is a list of people executed by the U.S. state of Florida since capital punishment was resumed in 1976.

The total amounts to 100 people. Of the 100 people executed, 44 have been executed by electrocution and 56 have been executed by lethal injection. The last person to be executed was Donald Dillbeck in February 2023.

Notes

See also 
 Capital punishment in Florida
 Capital punishment in the United States

References 

People executed by Florida
Florida
People executed
Executions